Welcome to the Wasteland is the only studio album by Chicago rock band Bad City.

Track listing
All songs composed by guitarists Tom Schleiter and Max Perenchio

"Showdown in Central Park" - 4:40
"Take Me For A Ride" - 3:43
"Do You Believe In Rock N Roll" - 3:44
"Wildlife" - 4:17
"Fire In The Pouring Rain" - 3:56
"Call Paul Stanley" - 4:38
"Heatwave" - 3:34
"Look Out!" - 4:55
"Touch" - 3:36
"Straight To The Grave" - 4:01
"Don't Stop" (Japanese Bonus Track) - 3:48 
"War on Love" (Japanese Bonus Track) - 3:34

Charts

Reviews

Paul Stanley from KISS is quoted as saying:" "Welcome To The Wasteland" is an absolute knockout and the best album I've heard in ages. A killer, cohesive album of great rock and bombastic production that has been sorely missing. Every track is a winner and Bad City raises the bar out of most band's reach. It's really that good."

References

Bad City albums
2010 debut albums